Povorino is an air base in Russia located 13 km southwest of Povorino.  It was an attack deployment base to be used in wartime, and contained no facilities of note.

Soviet Air Force bases
Povorinsky District